Sytkivtsi is an urban-type settlement in Haisyn Raion of Vinnytsia Oblast in Ukraine. Sytkivtsi belongs to Raihorod rural hromada, one of the hromadas of Ukraine. Population: 

Until 18 July 2020, Sytkivtsi belonged to Nemyriv Raion. The raion was abolished in July 2020 as part of the administrative reform of Ukraine, which reduced the number of raions of Vinnytsia Oblast to six. The area of Nemyriv Raion was split between Haisyn, Tulchyn, and Vinnytsia Raions, with Sytkivtsi being transferred to Haisyn Raion.

Economy

Transportation
Sytkivtsi railway station is on the railway line connecting Vinnytsia and Haisyn. There is infrequent passenger traffic.

The settlement has access to M30 highway which connects Vinnytsia and Kropyvnytskyi.

References

Urban-type settlements in Haisyn Raion